, also Sakugawa Satunushi and Tode Sakugawa, was a Ryūkyūan martial arts master and major contributor to the development of Te, the precursor to modern Karate.

Karate-do
In 1750, Sakukawa (or Sakugawa) began his training as a student of a Ryūkyūan monk, Peichin Takahara. After six years of training, Takahara suggested that Sakugawa train under Kusanku, a Chinese master in Ch'uan Fa. Sakugawa spent six years training with Kusanku, and began to spread what he learned to Ryūkyū in 1762. He became such an expert that people gave him the nickname Tōde ("Chinese Hand"). His most famous student, Matsumura Sōkon, went on to develop the Shuri-te which later develop into a number of karate styles including Shotokan, Shito-ryu, and Shōrin-ryū.

References

Okinawan male karateka
1733 births
1815 deaths
Ryukyuan people
18th-century martial artists